Edson Walter Shaw (August 7, 1895 – October 30, 1964) was a professional American football player who played in the National Football League (NFL) with the Rock Island Independents, Canton Bulldogs and the Akron Pros. Shaw won an NFL Championship in 1922 with the Bulldogs. He finish his career in 1923,  playing for the Pros. Before playing professionally, Shaw played college football at the University of Nebraska. He lettered in football in 1915, 1916 and 1917.

References

1895 births
1964 deaths
American football fullbacks
American football halfbacks
American football tackles
Akron Pros players
Canton Bulldogs players
Nebraska Cornhuskers football players
Rock Island Independents players
People from Tecumseh, Nebraska
Players of American football from Nebraska